Monreal, officially the Municipality of Monreal,  is a 4th class municipality in the province of Masbate, Philippines. According to the 2020 census, it has a population of 25,164 people.

It is located on the northern part of Ticao Island.

Geography

Barangays
Monreal is politically subdivided into 11 barangays.
 Cantorna
 Famosa
 MacArthur
 Maglambong
 Morocborocan
 Poblacion
 Guinhadap
 Real
 Rizal
 Santo Niño
 Togoron

Climate

Demographics

Economy

Monreal's local economy is based on fishing. A local conservation effort to protect the environment lead to the development of tourism industry in the municipality. The Halea Island Retreat and Nature Park is the number one attraction for tourists both local and foreign, creating employment opportunities for the local folks and generating revenues for the local government in terms of taxes.

Archaeological and Ecological Landscape and Seascape of Ticao
The municipality is part of Ticao island, which is known as an archaeological landscape, possessing thousands of pre-colonial artifacts such as the Baybayin-inscribed Rizal Stone, Ticao gold spike teeth, Burial jars of varying designs and sizes, jade beads, human face rock statues, and the Ticao petrographs.Much of the homes in Ticao island use these archaeological finds to design their interiors. The island is also an ecological frontier for the conservation of manta rays. The island also possesses a 'rare subspecies' of Visayan warty pig that is almost near extinction.

References

External links
 [ Philippine Standard Geographic Code]
 Philippine Census Information
 Local Governance Performance Management System

Municipalities of Masbate